Malik Muhammad Anwar is a Pakistani politician who had been a member of the Provincial Assembly of the Punjab from August 2018 till January 2023.

Early life and education
He was born on 25 April 1950 in Pindi Gheb, Attock District.

He completed his graduation from the University of the Punjab in 2002 and has a degree of Bachelor of Arts.

He joined Pakistan Army in 1970 and retired with the rank of Colonel in 1997.

Political career
He was elected to the Provincial Assembly of the Punjab as a candidate of Pakistan Muslim League (Q) (PML-Q) from Constituency PP-18 (Attock-IV) in 2002 Pakistani general election. He received 51,692 votes and defeated Sardar Salim Haider Khan. In January 2003, he was inducted into the provincial Punjab cabinet of Chief Minister Pervaiz Elahi and was made Provincial Minister of Punjab for Cooperatives.

He was re-elected to the Provincial Assembly of the Punjab as a candidate of Pakistan Tehreek-e-Insaf (PTI) from Constituency PP-4 (Attock-IV) in 2018 Pakistani general election.

On 27 August 2018, he was inducted into the provincial Punjab cabinet of Chief Minister Sardar Usman Buzdar without any ministerial portfolio. On 29 August 2018, he was appointed as Provincial Minister of Punjab for Revenue.

References

Living people
1950 births
Punjab MPAs 2002–2007
Punjab MPAs 2018–2023
Pakistan Muslim League (Q) MPAs (Punjab)
Pakistan Tehreek-e-Insaf MPAs (Punjab)
People from Attock District
Pakistan Army officers
Provincial ministers of Punjab